The commune of Bweru is a commune of Ruyigi Province in eastern Burundi. The capital lies at Bweru.

References

Communes of Burundi
Ruyigi Province